The obturator canal is a passageway formed in the obturator foramen by part of the obturator membrane and the pelvis. It connects the pelvis to the thigh.

Structure 
The obturator canal is formed between the obturator membrane and the pelvis. The obturator artery, obturator vein, and obturator nerve all travel through the canal.

Clinical significance
An obturator hernia is a type of hernia involving an intrusion into the obturator canal.

The obturator nerve can be compressed in the obturator canal.

The obturator canal may be compressed during pregnancy and major traumatic injuries, causing obturator syndrome.

See also
 Obturator fascia

References

External links

Pelvis